Turkey participated in the Eurovision Song Contest 2005 with the song "Rimi Rimi Ley" written by Göksan Arman and Erdinç Tunç. The song was performed by Gülseren.

Before Eurovision

27. Eurovision Şarkı Yarışması Türkiye Finali 
27. Eurovision Şarkı Yarışması Türkiye Finali was the national final organised by TRT in order to select Turkey's entry for the Eurovision Song Contest 2005. Seven acts competed during the show held on 11 February 2005 at the Ari Studio in Ankara, hosted by Meltem Yazgan and Bülent Özveren with the winner being selected by an expert jury. The show was broadcast on TRT 1 and TRT International as well as online via the broadcaster's official website trt.net.tr.

Competing entries 
TRT opened a submission period for interested artists and songwriters to submit their entries between 20 August 2004 and 29 November 2004. Songs were required to be written in Turkish. At the closing of the deadline, the broadcaster received 136 submissions. A fifteen-member selection committee consisting of Serpil Akıllıoğlu, Süleyman Erguner, Deniz Çakmakoğlu, Ümran Sönmezer, Muhsin Yıldırım, Adnan Süer, Tülay İtler Sunar, Neşet Ruacan, Kamil Özler, Garo Mafyan, Melih Kibar, İzzet Öz, Bülend Özveren, Ali Durgut and Zafer Ası selected seven entries from the received submissions to compete in the national final. The competing entries were announced on 12 January 2005 and among the competing artists was former Eurovision Song Contest entrant Sedat Yüce who represented Turkey in 2001. On 18 January 2005, TRT announced that Elya & Grup Ariana would replace Mine as the performers of the song "Sen Benim Aşkımsın".

Final 
The final took place on 11 February 2005. Seven songs competed and the winner, "Rimi Rimi Ley" performed by Gülseren, was determined by the votes of a 17-member jury panel. In addition to the performances of the competing entries, 1975 Turkish Eurovision entrant Semiha Yankı and winner of the Eurovision Song Contest 2004 for Ukraine Ruslana performed as guests.

Controversy 
Controversy emerged when a panel of seventeen judges was charged with finding a winner of the final, despite earlier plans to allow televoters to decide the outcome. The winner, Gülseren, was also accused of rigging the final result. After the Turkish national final, Umran Akdokur, songwriter of "Sen Benim Aşkımsın" performed by the group Ariana officially asked the court in Ankara to cancel the outcome. Akdokur had claimed "Rimi Rimi Ley" did not match the requirements as set by the board of the  Turkish public broadcaster TRT. Furthermore, it was claimed that Goksan Arman, the songwriter of the winning entry had been working for the TRT Grand Orchestra at the time, which is another contradiction to the entrance requirements issued by the TRT. The court of Ankara rejected all complaints against the Turkish Eurovision Song Contest entry on 8 May 2005.

At Eurovision
Turkey automatically qualified to the grand final, because it was on the top 12 last year. She performed sixth, following Norway and preceding Moldova, and came 13th with 92 points.

The spokesperson who revealed Turkey's votes for other countries was TRT and national final host Meltem Ersan Yazgan.

Voting

Points awarded to Turkey

Points awarded by Turkey

References

2005
Countries in the Eurovision Song Contest 2005
Eurovision